Liberty is the sixth studio album by English new wave band Duran Duran, released on 20 August 1990 by Parlophone. The album reached number eight on the UK Albums Chart, and spawned the singles "Violence of Summer (Love's Taking Over)" and "Serious".

Background
Duran Duran had emerged as one of the most successful bands of the 1980s, helping to both spearhead the so-called 'Second British Invasion' of the American charts and making increasingly striking music videos to promote their singles via MTV. By the end of the 1980s, however, the band had lost both Roger and Andy Taylor, who had quit shortly after their 1985 Live Aid performance. Subsequent studio albums released including Notorious and Big Thing were not well received either critically or commercially, selling in far fewer quantities than their predecessors. Whilst the 1989 Decade compilation managed to chart in the Top 10 around the world, it was seen as a temporary stop-gap and an opportunity for the band to decide what musical direction they wanted to explore in the 1990s.

Recording
Liberty is the first Duran Duran album to feature songwriting credits outside the lineup from the first three albums. Guitarist Warren Cuccurullo and drummer Sterling Campbell were made official band members and given songwriting credits, although Campbell would leave in early 1991, before the band began work on their subsequent album The Wedding Album.

Writing and rehearsing for the album took place intermittently between May and July 1989; demo sessions took place in August and September, and final recording began on 9 October at Olympic Studios, with producer Chris Kimsey and engineer Chris Potter. Recording, production and overdubbing of the many keyboard and vocal layers dragged on until March 1990.

In a 1998 interview with Goldmine magazine, bassist John Taylor admitted that he was struggling with his drug addictions during recording of the album. He said, "When we were in rehearsal, it seemed like we had a great album, but we weren't able to parlay it into a great album in the studio, whatever. I can just remember smoking hash oil, that's all I can really remember about making that album."

Vocalist Simon Le Bon commented, "We went into a barn in Sussex and started jamming away, and before we got finished, it was like, 'Right we've got the album, let's go and record it now.' And I don't think we got it right; I don't think we were paying enough attention. We were quite self-conscious at the time as well, the way things had been going, and it kind of made us stand outside of ourselves to do the album. But out of that came two of the best songs Duran's ever come up with, 'Serious' and 'My Antarctica,' they're really, really beautiful songs. I don't think it's a bad album, but there's definitely weak spots on it, definitely. I mean, something like 'Violence of Summer', it just didn't have a proper chorus, great verse though. Just not paying enough attention, we just lost our concentration." Ultimately though, he proved to be quite sanguine about the album as a whole, stating on its 25th anniversary in 2015: "I wouldn’t go back and change anything though, I’d rather spend two weeks writing a new song than making changes to Liberty. It was a point in time for Duran Duran. I really do look back on Liberty with a lot of fondness."

A bootleg recording of the demo sessions for the album, titled Didn't Anybody Tell You? surfaced in 1999. Many unreleased, scrapped songs from the Liberty sessions were heard by the public for the first time:

"Bottleneck"
"Money on Your Side"
"Dream Nation"
"In Between Woman"
"Worth Waiting For"
"My Family" (played live 1989)

When asked about the bootleg, John Taylor said, "I like coming across things that I've forgotten about. That I've forgotten that we recorded. That's what's really exciting about the Didn't Anybody Tell You bootleg, because there's so many songs on there that never got finished. They just take me back to that moment. Actually, what I like about that album is that the Liberty album - when we were rehearsing it, when we were writing it was gonna be a great album. I really felt it was gonna be a great album. When we got in the studio I fell apart and the production just wasn't right. It turned out to be a very mediocre album, but at the demo stage, which is what that [bootleg] album is all about, I think there's a great album in there. Could have been great songs."

Promotion and reception
After recording was completed, the band made the decision not to tour the album, making Liberty their first LP not to be performed live. There were, instead, some short promotional trips to Australia, New Zealand and Florence and additional TV appearances in the UK. Lead single "Violence of Summer (Love's Taking Over)" was additionally seen as a weak single to launch the album with, a decision that producer Chris Kimsey in particular felt was poor. In a 2020 interview with Paul Sinclar, the editor of website Super Deluxe Edition, Kimsey noted that either the songs "Serious" or "Liberty" should have been lead singles and the whole album may have seen more commercial success. 

Critical reception to Liberty was mainly negative with a number of music journalists slating the album; Trouser Press magazine described it as "a senseless collision of tuneless guitar raunch, Motown-inflected soul-pop and numbing dance grooves" whilst Q Magazines reviewer Andrew Martin suggested that only three tracks – "Liberty", "Serious" and "My Antarctica" – were worthy of inclusion, a view echoed in 2020 by producer Chris Kimsey, who said: "if you took all the crap off this album and had an EP, it would have been huge[...] the other stuff was, like, panic, pressure."

A positive review appeared in Spin in November 1990. Reviewer Mark Blackwell wrote "Liberty shows the band in its most appealing form in years (...) Duran Duran once again successfully straddle the line between dance and rock". Blackwell noted that "The new songs are charicastically slick, yet stripped-down. Effects and samples are minimal. The guitar is prominently back and the music is diverse", while admitting that "a couple of the songs, like "Hothead", are stupid and meaningless."

Track listing

Personnel
Duran Duran
 Simon Le Bon – lead vocals
 Nick Rhodes – keyboards
 John Taylor – bass guitar
 Warren Cuccurullo – guitars
 Sterling Campbell – drums

Additional musicians
 John Jones – Programming and additional keyboards
 Tessa Niles – background vocals
 Carol Kenyon – background vocals
 Bernard Fowler – background vocals
 Stan Harrison – saxophone
 Roddy Lorimer – trumpet
 Luís Jardim – percussion
 Spike Edney- additional keyboards, engineer

Charts

Certifications

References

1990 albums
Albums produced by Chris Kimsey
Albums recorded at Olympic Sound Studios
Duran Duran albums
Parlophone albums